Kent and Medway Medical School (KMMS) is a medical school based in Canterbury, Kent. It was created as a collaboration between the University of Kent and Canterbury Christ Church University, and offers around 100 places per year. Brighton and Sussex Medical School (BSMS) acts as the contingency school. KMMS offers five-year undergraduate programmes, with a focus on specialties currently under-represented in Kent and Medway.

History 
Funding for KMMS was announced in March 2018 following a competition to allocate 1500 new medical training posts across England. Stages 1 and 2 of the General Medical Council (GMC) accreditation process for new schools were completed in advance of this announcement. The Founding Dean was appointed in September 2018 and stages 3 to 6 of the GMC accreditation were completed before the first 100 students enrolled in September 2020.

Teaching 
As of the 2020/2021 academic year, the school has a single, 5-year undergraduate (UG) Bachelor of Medicine Bachelor of Surgery (BM BS) programme which will lead to a Primary Medical Qualification (PMQ) when the programme is accredited by the GMC in summer 2025.

Undergraduate programme

Structure 
The UG programme is closely linked to the 5-year programme offered by the KMMS' contingency school BSMS. It starts with two years of systems-based modules which cover the major body systems and include the foundational biopsychosocial knowledge required before years 3–5. Each year of years 1 and 2 also includes a Skills for Clinical Practice module and a Professional Development and Person Centred Care (PDPCP) module which each lasts for the full academic year. The PDPCP modules include immersion weeks of placement in General Practice and Community Health. There are 6 weeks of clinical placement in year 1 and 7 weeks in year 2. This amounts to one of the largest amounts of clinical placement time in the early stages of the programme of any UK medical school.

Years 3, 4 and 5 have yet to be delivered, but the school plans that they will be based on the principle of Longitudinal Integrated Placements (LIPs). This will involve students spending nearly the entire academic year on placement.

Final exams will happen around Easter time in year 5 and are followed by an Elective module and a Transition to Practice module.

Student selected components (SSCs) 
KMMS students have the opportunity to engage in some compulsory, but student selected activities. As in the BSMS programme students complete SSCs in Years 1 and 2. In year 4 there is a yearlong module called the Individual Research Project and in year 5 there is an Elective module.

Intercalation 
KMMS students will have the opportunity to intercalate. After the 3rd year they have the option to do an intercalated bachelor's degree, after 4th year they can choose to do an intercalated master's degree.

Admissions 
As one of five new schools which were granted places in 2018, KMMS has a strong mission to widen participation in medicine. This means broadening the demographic of students who get the opportunity to become doctors and ensuring that any unfair biases within their selection system are removed. In 2019 and 2020 they had approximately 1500 applications for 100 places.

KMMS welcomes applications from school leavers, graduate entrants and from people who have completed Access to Medicine programmes. All applicants must apply via the Universities and Colleges Admissions Service (UCAS) and complete the University Clinical Aptitude Test (UCAT) in the year that they apply to the school.

After application and shortlisting all selected applicants are invited to a Multiple Mini Interview (MMI).

The school issues offer letters to selected applicants in time with the usual UCAS timeline for medical and dental programmes.

References

External links 
 

Medical schools in England
University of Kent
Canterbury Christ Church University